Kelak-e Olya (also Romanized as Kelāk-e ‘Olyā; also known as Kelāk-e Bālā) is a village in Owzrud Rural District, Baladeh District, Nur County, Mazandaran Province, Iran. At the 2006 census, its population was 95, in 35 families.

References 

Populated places in Nur County